The Wiriehorn is a mountain of the Bernese Alps, located south of Zwischenflüh in the Bernese Oberland.

References

External links
 Wiriehorn on Hikr

Mountains of the Alps
Mountains of Switzerland
Mountains of the canton of Bern
Two-thousanders of Switzerland